Robert Andrew (died 1437), of Castle Eaton and Blunsdon St. Andrew, Wiltshire, was an English politician.

He was a Member (MP) of the Parliament of England for Cricklade in 1399 and for Wiltshire in March 1416, 1422, 1426 and 1433.

References

Year of birth missing
1437 deaths
English MPs 1399
English MPs March 1416
English MPs 1422
English MPs 1426
English MPs 1433
Members of the Parliament of England (pre-1707) for Cricklade